The Sikorsky S-76 is a medium-size commercial utility helicopter designed and produced by the American helicopter manufacturer Sikorsky Aircraft. It is the company's first helicopter specifically developed for the civilian market.

The S-76 was developed during the mid-1970s, originally being designated S-74 but renamed in honor of the U.S. Bicentennial. Drawing upon its recently-developed S-70 helicopter, it features twin turboshaft engines, four-bladed main and tail rotors, and retractable landing gear. On , the prototype performed its maiden flight. Several improved models were produced over time, including the S-76 Mk II launched in 1982, and the S-76B in 1987.

The S-76 initially encountered strong demand from the off-shore oil drilling industry; later on, demand shifted towards the VIP sector of the market. It performed several noteworthy flights, such as the first circumnavigation of the world in an east-to-west direction by a helicopter, and an autonomous demonstration flight during 2016. Sikorsky also used individual helicopters, often heavily modified for the purpose, for experimental purposes and to support other programmes. Demand for the S-76 waned during the 2010s, newer helicopters such as the AgustaWestland AW139 proved to be stiff competition. During March 2022, Sikorsky halted new orders for the S-76, but stated that it was looking at opportunities for future overseas manufacturing with foreign partners.

Development
The development of the S-76 commenced during the mid-1970s as the S-74. The S-74 was subsequently redesignated the S-76 in honor of the U.S. Bicentennial. The company had set the design goal of producing a medium helicopter suitable for corporate transportation and the oil drilling industry. Sikorsky's design work on the S-70 helicopter (which was selected for use by the United States Army as the UH-60 Black Hawk) was utilized in the development of the S-76, incorporating S-70 design technology in its rotor blades and rotor heads. It was the first Sikorsky helicopter designed purely for commercial rather than military use.

On , the prototype performed its maiden flight.

The first production variant was the S-76A. Several improved models were produced over time. During 1982, the S-76 Mk II, equipped with more powerful engines and other refinements, was introduced. By early 2001, in excess of 500 S-76s had been delivered.

During the early 2000s, the S-76C+ was the main version in production; it was equipped with twin Turbomeca Arriel 2S1 engines with FADEC and a Honeywell EFIS suite. This version also incorporated active noise suppression, vibration dampers and a composite main rotor. On , the S-76 C++ replaced earlier versions in production; it is powered by twin Turbomeca Arriel 2S2 engines and incorporates an improved and quieter transmission as well as minor changes in the interior equipment and avionics. By January 2006, Sikorsky had secured 92 orders for this model.

Development of the follow-on S-76D was subject to four years of delays due to technical problems in expanding the flight envelope. On , the prototype conducted its first flight, and type certification was initially expected during 2011 while deliveries were forecast to start at the end of that year. Three prototypes were used in the certification program, with one aircraft used to certify the optional rotor electric ice-protection system. The "D" model is powered by  Pratt & Whitney Canada PW210S engines driving composite rotors and incorporates active vibration control. Performance is substantially improved with the added power, but initial certification retains the same  gross weight and maximum  cruise speed as earlier models.

The rate of manufacturing noticeably declined during the 2010s; only a dozen S-76s were delivered between 2016 and 2020. During September 2013, it was announced that the Chinese manufacturer Changhe Aircraft Industries Corporation had been contracted to produce the S-76D airframe. By 2022 April, in excess of 875 S-76s had reportedly been built.

During March 2022, Sikorsky announced that it had halted new orders for the S-76 while potential overseas manufacturing partners and licensing opportunities were being evaluated. Reasons for the hold included decreasing sales volume, the high cost of supply and manufacturing, and the prohibitive costs associated with adapting the S-76 to meet increasing safety mandates. This move effectively ended production of the S-76 following the completion of the three orders that were outstanding, and represented a withdrawal by Sikorsky from the medium commercial helicopter market. Sikorsky has stated that it will continue to actively manufacture spare parts for the S-76 at its Connecticut facility.

Design

The S-76 is of a conventional configuration, with a four-bladed fully articulated main rotor and a four-bladed anti-torque rotor on the port side of the tailboom. It is powered by a pair of turboshaft engines, which are located above the passenger cabin. These engines are connected to the main rotor by the main gearbox, a three-stage unit with a bull gear as its final stage, rather than the planetary gear that had been used by previous generations of Sikorsky helicopters. This arrangement has 30% fewer parts and lower costs than a more conventional design.

The main rotor is furnished with a single piece aluminum hub fitted with elastomeric bearings, which are designed not to require lubrication or any other kind of maintenance throughout its design life. The main rotor blades have titanium spars and incorporate a ten degree twist to provide an even loading when hovering, while they use a non-symmetrical airfoil section with a drooped leading edge. The rotor tips are tapered and swept back. The rotor blades on later-build S-76s feature ice protection measures. The flight controls are servo-assisted and have a Stability Augmentation System fitted. Emergency flotation gear can be fitted, which uses helium-filled bags to increase buoyancy in the event of a forced landing on water.

The fuselage of the S-76 is made from both metal and composite materials; while the nose is composed of fiberglass, the cabin area primarily employs a light alloy honeycomb structure, the semi-monocoque tailboom is also constructed of light alloy. A pair of pilots are typically seated in a side-by-side arrangement in the cockpit, situated ahead of the cabin, which can accommodate a further 12 passengers in three rows of four, or between four and eight passengers in a more luxurious executive seating configuration. Later models can be flown by a single pilot when provisioned with an appropriately configured cockpit. The S-76 was not originally designed with crashworthy fuel systems, leading to difficulties continuing production after an FAA requirement was implemented in April 2020.

Operational history
Early on in its commercial career, the S-76 became popular for offshore operations, such as to oil rigs. Numerous operators have either purchased or leased the type specifically to operate in this sector.

During 1982, the S-76A set multiple class records for range, climb, speed and ceiling. In June 1995, the S-76 became the first helicopter to circumnavigate the world in an east-to-west direction, piloted by the Australian adventurer Dick Smith.

Several airlines have operated the S-76A on scheduled services, including Helijet Airways of Vancouver, British Columbia, Canada.

During the campaigning in the run up to the 2005 United Kingdom general election, both the Labour and the Conservative parties dispensed with conventional 'battle buses' in favour of S-76 helicopters to quickly transport their leaders around the British Isles. According to Jason Lambert, Sikorsky's vice president of commercial and military systems, the S-76 had proven itself to be particularly popular amongst VIP customers. By 2020, according to Sikorsky, ten countries operated S-76s to carry their heads of state.

S-76s have been periodically used to test new technologies and capabilities. The highly-modified S-76 SHADOW (Sikorsky Helicopter Advance Demonstrator of Operators Workload) was built to demonstrate its advanced cockpit for single-pilot operations and to study the human engineering interface between the pilot and the cockpit controls and displays; this was in aid of the RAH-66 Comanche armed reconnaissance helicopter programme. During the 2010s, an S-76 was configured for autonomous operation and demonstrated this ability in June 2016, flying for a distance of around 30 miles (48 km) with no human intervention beyond limited inputs made via a tablet computer, the take off and landing phases were also performed autonomously.

During the 2010s, many S-76 operators elected to replace the type with newer medium-lift rotorcraft, such as the AgustaWestland AW139. In early 2020, it was observed that, while the S-76D was no longer compliant with FAA regulations to permit its sale to US-based customers, sales were still possible to several other countries.

Variants

Civil

 Original production version, powered by two  Rolls-Royce (Allison) 250-C30 turboshaft engines. Large number modified to S-76A+, A++, C, and C+. 284 manufactured.
S-76A Utility
 Utility transport version, equipped with sliding doors and a strengthened floor.
S-76A+
 Unsold S-76s were fitted with two Turbomeca Arriel 1S turboshaft engines. 17 manufactured.

 S-76 helicopters fitted with two Turbomeca Arriel 1S1 turboshaft engines.
S-76A Mk II
 Improved all-weather transport version, fitted with more powerful engines, and other detail improvements.

 Powered by two Pratt & Whitney Canada PT6B-36A or Pratt & Whitney Canada PT6B-36B turboshaft engines. 101 built.

 Powered by two 539-kW (981-shp) Turbomeca Arriel 1S1 turboshaft engines. 43 manufactured.

 Uprated version, fitted with improved Turbomeca Arriel 2S1 turboshafts with FADEC. 35 manufactured.
S-76C++
 Turbomeca Arriel 2S2

 Powered by two Pratt & Whitney Canada PW210S. Also features a Thales Topdeck avionics suite and improved noise signature over all previous variants.

Military
AUH-76
Armed utility transport version, developed from the S-76 Mk. II.
H-76 Eagle
A militarised variant suitable for naval operations, based on the S-76B, it was announced during 1985 but none were ever sold.

Experimental derivatives

Sikorsky S-75 The Advanced Composite Airframe Program (ACAP) was an all-composite Sikorsky early LHX proof of concept aircraft. Designated S-75, it mated a new composite airframe with S-76 engines, rotors and powertrain components.
Sikorsky S-76 SHADOW Boeing-Sikorsky MANPRINT study. The original concept of the LHX program was to produce a one-man helicopter that could do more than a two-man aircraft. The Sikorsky (S-76) Helicopter Advance Demonstrator of Operators Workload (SHADOW) had a single-pilot advanced cockpit grafted to its nose. The purpose was to study the MANPRINT or human engineering interface between the pilot and the cockpit controls and displays. The cockpit was the prototype of a single-pilot cockpit designed for use on the prototype RAH-66 Comanche armed reconnaissance helicopter. The cockpit was designed so sensors would feed data to the pilot through helmet-mounted displays. The MANPRINT study determined that single-pilot operation of the Comanche was unsafe, and would result in pilot overload. As result of this study, the Comanche was designed to be operated by a crew of two.

Operators

Civil
The S-76 is in civil service around the world with airlines, corporations, hospitals, and government operators. The world's largest civilian fleet is the 79 Sikorsky S-76 helicopters operated by CHC Helicopter Corporation.

Current military and government

 Argentine Air Force

 Ministry of Transport

 Japan Coast Guard

 Royal Jordanian Air Force

 Philippine Air Force

 National Airborne Service Corps

 Ministry of Interior

 Serbian Ministry of the Interior

 Spanish Air and Space Force
 Galician Coast Guard

 Royal Thai Navy

 The King's Helicopter Flight

Former military and government

 Royal Australian Air Force (replaced by the AgustaWestland AW139 during the late 2010s)

 Ornge / Ontario Air Ambulance Corp. (originally owned by Canadian Helicopters and eventually o/o by Ornge and replaced by AW139 in 2012)

 Honduran Air Force

 Royal Hong Kong Auxiliary Air Force
 Government Flying Service

 Icelandic Coast Guard

Accidents
 On 17 July 2002, S-76A G-BJVX, operated by Bristow Helicopters, crashed into the North Sea due to the failure of a main rotor blade. The operator temporarily halted all helicopter flights over the North Sea until operations resumed on 3 September 2002.
 On 10 August 2005, a Sikorsky S-76C+ flying Copterline Flight 103 crashed into Tallinn Bay in the Gulf of Finland. The cause was a failure of the hydraulic flight control system.
 On 31 May 2013, an S-76A air ambulance, operated by Omge, crashed near Moosonee Airport, Canada. The cause was inadequate training of pilots for night-time operations.
 On 10 March 2017, S-76C++ TC-HEZ, operated by Swan Aviation, crashed during a private charter flight in Istanbul, Turkey. The cause is unknown, but poor visibility conditions were present at the time.
 On 26 January 2020, S-76B N72EX crashed in Calabasas, California, killing all nine occupants, including the retired professional basketball player Kobe Bryant and his daughter Gianna.

Specifications (Sikorsky S-76C++)

See also

Notes

References

Citations

Further reading

External links

 
 
 
 
 
 

1970s United States civil utility aircraft
1970s United States helicopters
Aircraft first flown in 1977
S-076
Twin-turbine helicopters